Panayiotis Artymatas  (Greek: Παναγιώτης Αρτυματάς; born 12 November 1998) is a Cypriot professional footballer who plays as a centre back for Apollon Limassol.

Career
On 12 January 2014, Artymatas made his debut for EN Paralimni in a match against AEL Limassol.
His brothers is Kostakis Artymatas.

References

External links

1998 births
Living people
Cypriot footballers
Anorthosis Famagusta F.C. players
Cypriot First Division players
Association football defenders